Per Erik Jonas Sjölander (born 12 August 1965) is a Swedish curler.

He participated in the demonstration curling events at the 1988 Winter Olympics and 1992 Winter Olympics, where the Swedish team finished in fifth place both times.

Teams

References

External links

Living people
1965 births
People from Härnösand
Swedish male curlers
Curlers at the 1988 Winter Olympics
Curlers at the 1992 Winter Olympics
Olympic curlers of Sweden
Sportspeople from Västernorrland County
20th-century Swedish people